Michael A. Parker (born July 1975, in Houston, Texas) is a former professional American football linebacker in the National Football League. He played college football at University of Houston (1994-1998) where he was named  All Conference Linebacker. He signed as an NFL Free Agent in 1998 for the Tennessee Oilers, also played for Minnesota Vikings and Barcelona Dragons in NFL Europe.

References

Living people
1975 births
American football linebackers
Houston Cougars football players